Lu Yen-hsun was the defending champion but chose not to defend his title.

Márton Fucsovics won the title after defeating Alex Bolt 6–1, 6–4 in the final.

Seeds

Draw

Finals

Top half

Bottom half

References
Main Draw
Qualifying Draw

Aegon Ilkley Trophy - Men's Singles
2017 Men's Singles